Ericeia sobria is a moth in the family Erebidae. It is found in Kenya, South Africa (Eastern Cape), Gambia, Borneo, New Guinea and Australia, where it has been recorded from Queensland and New South Wales.

The wings are patterned brown with a darker vague submarginal band.

References

Moths described in 1858
Ericeia